Sebastes koreanus, the Korean rockfish, is a subtropical marine fish distributed in the Northwest Pacific Ocean near South Korea. It usually lives at a depth of around 20 meters. It is demersal and oviparous, like all other rockfishes.

References 

Fish of Korea
Fish described in 1994
koreanus